Ploubalay is a small town and former commune in the Côtes-d'Armor department of Brittany in northwestern France. On 1 January 2017, it was merged into the new commune Beaussais-sur-Mer.

Geography
The little town is near the sea but, unusually for this stretch of coast, it has no beach of its own.

For road users, Ploubalay deserves the epithet carrefour des plages/"crossroads of the beaches". It is crossed by the D2 departmental road connecting Dinan with the coast and by the D786 linking Plancoët with Dinard.

Population

Inhabitants of Ploubalay are called ploubalaysiens in French.

See also
 Communes of the Côtes-d'Armor department

References

External links

 

Former communes of Côtes-d'Armor